In the larger context of Navier-Stokes Equations but especially in the context of potential theory Elementary flows are a collection of basic flows  from which it is possible to construct more complex flows with different techniques. 
In this article the term flows is used interchangeably to the term solutions due to historical reasons.

The techniques involved to create more complex solutions can be 
for example by superposition, by techniques such as topology or considering them as local solutions on a certain neighborhood, subdomain or boundary layer and to be patched together. Elementary flows can be considered the basic building blocks (Fundamental solutions, local solutions and solitons) of the different types of equations derived from the Navier-Stokes. Some of the flows reflect specific cases  constraints such as incompressible or irrotational flows, or both, as in the case of potential flow, and some of the flows are often limited in the case of 2 dimensions.

Due to the relation from fluid dynamics to all field theory It's important to understand how all these flows are relevant not only to aerodynamics but to all field theory in general. To put it in perspective boundary layers can be interpreted as topological defects on generic manifolds, and considering fluid dynamics analogies and limit cases in electromagnetism, quantum mechanics and general relativity one can see how all these solutions are at the core of  recent developments in  theoretical physics such as the ads/cft duality, the SYK model, the physics of nematic liquids, strongly correlated systems and even to quark gluon plasmas.

Two-dimensional uniform flow 

Given a uniform velocity of a fluid at any position in space:

This flow is incompressible because the velocity is constant, the first derivatives of the velocity components are zero, and the total divergence is zero: 

Given the circulation is always zero the flow is also irrotational, we can derive this from the Kelvin's circulation theorem and from the explicit computation of the vorticity:

Being incompressible and two-dimensional, this flow is constructed from a stream function:

from which

and in cylindrical coordinates:

from which

As usual the stream function is defined up to a constant value which here we take as zero. We can also confirm that the flow is irrotational from:

Being irrotational, the potential function is instead:

and therefore

and in cylindrical coordinates

Two-dimensional line source 

The case of a vertical line emitting at a fixed rate a constant quantity of fluid Q per unit length is a line source. The problem has a cylindrical symmetry and can be treated in two dimension on the orthogonal plane.

Line sources and line sinks (below) are important elementary flows because they play the role of monopole(s) for incompressible fluids (which can also be considered examples of solenoidal fields i.e. divergence free fields). Generic flow patterns can be also de-composed in terms of multipole expansions, in the same manner as for electric and magnetic fields where the monopole is essentially the first non-trivial (e.g. constant) term of the expansion.

This flow pattern is also both irrotational and incompressible.

This is characterized by a cylindrical symmetry:

Where the total outgoing flux is constant
 

Therefore,

This is derived from a stream function

or from a potential function

Two-dimensional line sink 
The case of a vertical line absorbing at a fixed rate a constant quantity of fluid Q per unit length is a line sink. Everything is the same as the case of a line source a part from the negative sign.

This is derived from a stream function

or from a potential function

Given that the two results are the same a part from a minus sign we can treat transparently both line sources and line sinks with the same stream and potential functions permitting Q to assume both positive and negative values and absorbing the minus sign into the definition of Q.

Two-dimensional doublet or dipole line source 

If we consider a line source and a line sink at a distance d we can reuse the results above and the stream function will be

The last approximation is to the first order in d.

Given

It remains

The velocity is then

And the potential instead

Two-dimensional vortex line 

This is the case of a vortex filament rotating at constant speed, there is a cylindrical symmetry and the problem can be solved in the orthogonal plane.

Dual to the case above of line sources, vortex lines play the role of monopoles for irrotational flows.

Also in this case the flow is also both irrotational and incompressible and therefore a case of potential flow.

This is characterized by a cylindrical symmetry:

Where the total circulation is constant for every closed line around the central vortex 

and is zero for any line not including the vortex.

Therefore,

This is derived from a stream function

or from a potential function

Which is dual to the previous case of a line source

Generic two-dimensional potential flow 
Given an incompressible two-dimensional flow which is also irrotational we have:

Which is in cylindrical coordinates 

We look for a solution with separated variables:

which gives

The constant shall be positive.
Therefore,

In order to have a single-valued velocity (and also a single-valued stream function) m shall be a positive integer.

therefore the most generic solution is given by

The potential is instead given by

References

Specific

Further reading

External links
 

 

Fluid dynamics